The Nigerian Export-Import Bank (NEXIM)  is an export credit agency in Nigeria, established in 1991. In its function, NEXIM focuses on the development and expansion of the non-oil sectors of the Nigerian economy, with a view to reducing the country's over-reliance on oil exports.

Mission 
The NEXIM mission is to increase the rate of export of non-oil product for both small, medium, and large enterprises in all sectors of the economy by providing funds, risk-bearing programs, and advisory services in line with government trade policy.

Location
The headquarters of Nexim are located at NEXIM House, Central Business District,  Garki, Abuja, Nigeria. Nexim House is bordered by Kur Mohammed Avenue to the north, Ahmadu Bello Way to the east and Constitution Avenue to the south. Its geographical coordinates are: 09°03'44.0"N, 07°29'37.0"E (Latitude: 09.062222; Longitude:07.493611).

Overview
NEXIM was established in 1991 as a joint venture between the Central Bank of Nigeria (CBN) and the Federal Ministry of Finance Incorporated (MOFI), with an initial capital of NGN: 50,000,000,000 (approx. US$132 million in 2021 money). *Note: US$1.00 = NGN379.52 on 27 February 2021.

According to the bank's website, some of its core functions include the following:

1. "Provision of export credit guarantee and export credit insurance to qualifying clients".

2. "Provision of credit in local currency to its clients in support of exports".

3. "Maintenance of a foreign exchange revolving fund for lending to exporters who need to import foreign inputs to facilitate export production".

4. "Maintenance of a trade information system in support of export business".

Ownership
The financial institution is jointly owned by the CBN and MOFI, on a 50/50 basis.

Financial position
As of 31 December 2015, the bank's total assets were valued at NGN:64,731,403,000 (approx. US$170,562,000 in 2021 money), with shareholders' capital of NGN:41,150,885,000 (US$108,429,000). *Note: US$1.00 = NGN379.52 on 27 February 2021.

See also
 List of banks in Nigeria
 Economy of Nigeria
 ECOWAS

References

External links
 Company Profile At Wand.com As of April 2015.
 NEXIM Bank: Positioning The Economy For Post Crisis Performance As of November 2020.

Export credit agencies
Abuja
Banks of Nigeria
Banks established in 1991
1991 establishments in Nigeria
Foreign trade of Nigeria